The Wildest Dreams Tour is the ninth concert tour by singer Tina Turner. The tour supported her ninth studio album Wildest Dreams (1996). The tour is Turner's biggest outing to date, performing over 250 shows in Europe, North America and Australasia—surpassing her Break Every Rule Tour. Lasting nearly 16 months, the tour continued her success as a major concert draw. The European leg alone sold 3 million tickets and generated an estimated US$100 million. The tour further grossed around US$30 million in North America. It was sponsored by Hanes, as Turner became the spokesperson for their new hosiery line.

Background 
Shortly after the release of the James Bond theme "GoldenEye", Turner announced that she would embark on a tour in 1996. In April 1996, Turner performed a private concert for the niece of Sultan Hassanal Bolkiah of Brunei. The tour officially began with five dates in Singapore and South Africa. While performing in Johannesburg, Turner was joined onstage by Vusa Dance Company to perform "Do What You Do". After the performance, Turner approached dancer David Matamela and gave him a scholarship to the Alvin Ailey Dance School. Despite high ticket prices, Turner's four South African stadium dates proved to be a success by drawing a total of 129,000 people. During rehearsals, Turner was not impressed with the stage design. She felt the stage was too dark and felt awkward to perform on. It was later reworked to Turner's liking. Elements of the stage can be seen in Turner's 50th Anniversary Tour.

While promoting the North American leg of the tour, it was announced talk show personality Oprah Winfrey would follow the tour with her syndicated talk show from Houston to New York City. Winfrey described the event as her dream stating,  "She is our goddess of rock 'n' roll. We are going to be right there with Miss Tina. We're going on tour with Tina. 'The Oprah Show' is actually going on the road with Tina. I am the biggest Tina Turner fan there is. It is my wildest dream." In her own words, Turner believed this could be her best tour in North America. She further commented, "It could be my best tour ever in America. When I walk on stage, there's such a feeling of faces looking back at me with love and admiration. [And] it turns into a togetherness. It really is about a desire from the people. The last tour I actually announced to my audience that I would be back. It was only because of that feeling, because that's the kind of audience I have."

Death of Kenny Moore 
During the tour, pianist Kenny Moore suffered health problems. In Sydney, New South Wales, he was admitted to the hospital and later pronounced deceased due to apoplexy. Moore had worked with Turner since 1977. Chuckii Booker replaced Moore for the remaining dates of the tour. Turner dedicated every performance thereafter to Moore.

Bomb scare in New Zealand 
After successfully touring New Zealand with her last feat, Turner returned to an expanded tour in the region. The leg proved to be a success for Turner as dates quickly sold out. However, during her concert in Wellington, New Zealand, Turner was removed from the stage and the building was later evacuated by local police due to a possible bomb at the venue. After a full sweep of the building, Turner resumed the concert nearly three hours later. The same incident happened in Palmerston North.

Broadcasts and recordings 
Microsoft Music Central joined Turner on tour to give spectators a "behind the scenes" diary. Entries are written by Turner and her crew as they performed throughout Australasia and North America. The program also contained backstage footage and photos, along with, exclusive concert footage, music videos, and interviews with Turner and Oprah Winfrey.

Additionally, Turner's performance in Johannesburg was broadcast on SABC 3 in April 1996. Turner's Moscow performance was broadcast on Channel One.

Before Turner toured North America, The Showtime Network aired her concert from the Amsterdam ArenA in Amsterdam Netherlands on April 1, 1997. The concert footage was later made available on VHS in September 1997, followed by a DVD released in 1999. The DVD contained an interview with Turner as well as the music video for "Whatever You Want".

In 1998, the VHS was nominated for a Grammy in the Best Long Form Music Video category, losing to "Jagged Little Pill, Live".

Additional concert footage was displayed on "The Oprah Winfrey Show", she and her television followed the tour from The Woodlands to New York City. In return, Turner performed a private concert on June 4, 1997, at the historic Navy Pier in Chicago, Illinois for the annual PROMAX International.

Band 
Drums: Jack Bruno
Guitar: James Ralston and John Miles
Bass guitar: Bob Feit and Warren McRae1
Keyboards: Ollie Marland and Timmy Cappello
Saxophone: Timmy Cappello
Percussion: Timmy Cappello
Piano: Kenny Moore and Chuckii Booker2
Supporting vocals: Chuckii Booker, James Ralston, John Miles, Kenny Moore, Timmy Cappello Ollie Marland, Karen Owens, Sharon Owens and Cynthia Davila
Dancers: Karen Owens, Sharon Owens and Cynthia Davila

1March–August 1997
2Replaced Moore after his death in March 1997.

Opening acts 
Jimmy Barnes 
Cyndi Lauper 
Belinda Carlisle 
Tony Joe White 
The Accelerators 
Brian Kennedy 
Toto 
Peter Andre 
Chris Isaak 
Grace Jones (singer) (Moscow )

Setlist 
{{hidden
| headercss = background: #ccccff; font-size: 100%; width: 100%;
| contentcss = text-align: left; font-size: 100%; width: 100%;
| header = Asia/Africa
| content = 
Act 1
"Whatever You Want"
 Do What You Do
 Thief of Hearts
"On Silent Wings"
"Missing You"
"In Your Wildest Dreams"
Act 2
"GoldenEye"
"River Deep – Mountain High"
"Private Dancer"
Act 3
"We Don't Need Another Hero (Thunderdome)"
"Let's Stay Together"
"Undercover Agent for the Blues"
"Steamy Windows"
"Better Be Good to Me"
Act 4
"Addicted To Love"
"The Best"
"What's Love Got to Do with It"
"Proud Mary"
Encore
"Nutbush City Limits"
"Unfinished Sympathy"
}}

{{hidden
| headercss = background: #ccccff; font-size: 100%; width: 100%;
| contentcss = text-align: left; font-size: 100%; width: 100%
| header = Europe/Australasia/North America
| content =
Act 1
"Whatever You Want"
"Do What You Do"
"River Deep – Mountain High"
"Missing You"
"In Your Wildest Dreams"
Act 2
"GoldenEye"
"Private Dancer"
Act 3
"We Don't Need Another Hero (Thunderdome)"
"Let's Stay Together"
"I Can't Stand the Rain"
"Undercover Agent for the Blues"
"Steamy Windows"
"Giving It Up for Your Love"
"Better Be Good to Me"
Act 4
"Addicted to Love"
"The Best"
"What's Love Got to Do with It"
"Proud Mary"
Encore
"Nutbush City Limits"
"On Silent Wings"
}}

Additional notes

Tour dates 

Cancellations and rescheduled shows

Festivals and other miscellaneous performances
 This concert is a part of Festival Ischgl/Top of the Mountain Concert

Box office score data

External links 
 Wildest Dreams 1996–1997
 WDT Stage Concept and Design

References 

Tina Turner concert tours
1996 concert tours
1997 concert tours